The 2006 FIA GT Adria Supercar 500 was the ninth and penultimate race for the 2006 FIA GT Championship season.  It took place on October 15, 2006.

Official results

Class winners in bold.  Cars failing to complete 70% of winner's distance marked as Not Classified (NC).

† – Car #59 was disqualified for an illegal ride height in post-race inspection.

Statistics
 Pole Position – #9 Zakspeed Racing – 1:11.304
 Average Speed – 128.93 km/h

External links
 Official Results

A
FIA GT Adria